École Carrefour de l'Acadie is a Francophone middle school located in Dieppe, New Brunswick, Canada, with an enrollment of up to 360.

History
École Carrefour de l'Acadie was officially opened on December 4, 2006. Built at a cost of $5 million, the school planned to house 580 students in grades 6 to 8.

The school was set up in vacant space at École Mathieu-Martin. The project involved the construction of a gymnasium, development of a cafeteria, and the renovation of 30 classrooms and specialized premises with its own entrance. The middle school enabled School District 01 to relocate a portion of its student population in order to reduce the overpopulation at the Anna Malenfant and Amirault schools in Dieppe.

See also
 Francophone Sud School District
 List of schools in New Brunswick

References

External links
 Official website (French)

Education in Dieppe, New Brunswick
International Baccalaureate schools in New Brunswick
2006 establishments in New Brunswick
Educational institutions established in 2006